The third round of the women's points race of the 2007–08 UCI Track Cycling World Cup Classics took place in Los Angeles, United States on 19 January 2008. 57 cyclists participated in the contest.

Competition format
A points race is a race in which all riders start together and the object is to earn points during sprints or to lap the bunch.

The tournament consisted of three qualifying heats of 10 km (40 laps) with four sprints. The top eight cyclist of each heat advanced to the 20 km final (80 laps) with eight sprints.

Schedule
Saturday 19 January
15:25-15:45 Qualifying heat 1
15:45-16:05 Qualifying heat 2
16:05-16:25 Qualifying heat 3
20:10-20:40 Final
21:05-21:10 Victory Ceremony

Schedule from Tissottiming.com

Results

Qualifying

Qualifying Heat 1

Results from Tissottiming.com.

Qualifying Heat 2

Results from Tissottiming.com.

Qualifying Heat 3

Results from Tissottiming.com.

Final

Results from Tissottiming.com.

World Cup Standings
World Cup standings after 3 of 4 2007–08 World Cup races.

Results from Tissottiming.com.

See also
 2007–08 UCI Track Cycling World Cup Classics – Round 3 – Women's individual pursuit
 2007–08 UCI Track Cycling World Cup Classics – Round 3 – Women's scratch

References

2007–08 UCI Track Cycling World Cup Classics
2008 in American sports
UCI Track Cycling World Cup – Women's points race